is a Japanese popular pop singer-songwriter and actress, who gained her popularity as a teen idol in the early 80s.

Biography 
Born in Osaka, Yoshie Kashiwabara took part in, and won, the "Star Tanjo" contest in 1979, and rose to fame in 1980 as a teen idol, making her debut with the song "No.1" when she was only 14 years old. With determination and strong will, plus a good voice, Yoshie finally made it with a top 10 song "Hello Goodbye" – her 7th single – in autumn 1981, bringing her instant fame and popularity.

Yoshie's strong performance continued in 1982, with all four of her singles in that year making it into the top 10, and many were expecting her to be selected for the year-end NHK Red and White Song festival, but she was surprisingly dropped while Junko Mihara, who also debuted in 1980 along with Yoshie, was chosen, making it the headline news for that year's annual show.

Yoshie continued to work hard the next year (1983) not only by singing; she acted in a few dramas as well, and as expected, she was finally rewarded by being selected for that year's Red and White Song Festival.

In 1985, Yoshie tried to leave her teen idol image behind by portraying a more mature, sexier image, and was well recognised. Her sexy posters for her hit song "Quietly in love" (し・の・び・愛), which were hung on buildings and advertisement venues, were all stolen within days, and in this year it was found out that the then Crown Prince of Japan was a big fan of Yoshie, and instantly she was the talk of the town, pushing her to return to the stage of Kohaku (Red and White) for a second (and final) appearance.

From 1986 onwards, Yoshie began writing lyrics for her own songs, but in the ever-competitive Japanese music industry, her popularity began to decline precipitously. She then began to focus on acting and releasing many photography album, mostly featuring her in swimsuits and/or sexy lingerie.

She has released a total of 37 singles, but only and after 1990. Her last single was released in 2008, for which she wrote the lyrics. As of now, Yoshie still sings and held her annual gala dinner show.

One of her biggest hits, "Haru na no ni", composed by Miyuki Nakajima, which was released in spring 1983, was a song about graduation, and is still one of the most popular graduation-themed songs, which is performed all over Japan during graduation period.

Other than producing 18 top-ten singles from 1981 to 1986 and performing twice (1983 and 1985) on the annual Kohaku, Yoshie's biggest achievement during her career was perhaps, despite being labelled as a pop idol, to be nominated for the best singing female artist for three consecutive years (1985–1987).

In 2011, one of the most famous Japanese music programs, Music Station, held a special programme where they counted down the Top 50 Idols of All-Time (the list spanning over four decades) based on their sales total; Yoshie Kashiwabara was in the 40th position, with total sales of 4,400,000 copies.

In 2017, Yoshie released her long-awaited new photography album named Yoshie MODE, one of the most expensive photography albums being sold, which was well received.

Personal life 

Yoshie is single. She is very much into fine clay art work, cooking, movies, photography and scuba diving.

Discography

External links 
 
 Official profile at Freeboard

1965 births
Japanese women pop singers
Living people
Musicians from Osaka
Singing talent show winners